Facundo Aguirre (born 9 December 1985) is an Argentine alpine skier. He competed in the men's giant slalom at the 2006 Winter Olympics.

References

1985 births
Living people
Argentine male alpine skiers
Olympic alpine skiers of Argentina
Alpine skiers at the 2006 Winter Olympics
People from General Roca